Deir al-'Asal al-Fauqa is a Palestinian town located sixteen kilometers west of Hebron.The town is in the Hebron Governorate Southern West Bank. According to the Palestinian Central Bureau of Statistics, the town had a population of over 1,600 in 2007.

Etymology
According to Palmer, the name Deir el ’Asl means  "the monastery of honey".

History
Ceramics from the Byzantine era have been found here.

Ottoman era
In 1838, a Deir el-'Asl  was noted as a place "in ruins or deserted," part of the area between the mountains and  Gaza, but subject to the government of el-Khulil.

In 1863 Victor Guérin noted "considerable ruins" at Khirbet Deir el-A'sal. There were ruined houses at each step he walked, and he  found cisterns, silos and underground stores, dug into the rock, "probably dating back to ancient times".

In 1883, the PEF's Survey of Palestine found here "foundations, and heaps of stones, caves, cisterns, and a ruined chapel, apparently Byzantine."

British Mandate era
At the time of the 1931 census of Palestine the population of the village, called Kh. Der el Asal el Gharbiya,  was counted under Dura.

Jordanian era
In the wake of the 1948 Arab–Israeli War, and after the 1949 Armistice Agreements, Deir al-'Asal al-Fauqa came under Jordanian rule.

In 1961, the population of Deir al-'Asal al-Fauqa was  282.

1967, aftermath
After the  Six-Day War, Deir al-'Asal al-Fauqa has been under Israeli occupation.

In March 2013, Yusef a-Shawamreh, a 14-year-old from the village, who went with two others through the Israeli West Bank barrier near the village to pick Akub on part of his family's land west of the barrier, was shot to death by Israeli soldiers, stationed to prevent unauthorized passage through the barrier. According to an IDF investigation, a-Shawamreh and his partners made a hole in the fence before passing. After passing through the fence the soldiers called them to stop. When they tried to escape, the soldiers  shot towards a-Shawamreh's leg but mistakenly hit his waist, causing his death. Therefore, the soldiers were not prosecuted. B'Tselem criticized this decision, claiming that a-Shawamreh was shot without warning, and that, in any event, the decision to put soldiers in ambush near the fence and shoot those who pass was illegal.

Footnotes

Bibliography

    
 

  

  
 
 (p. 110)

External links
Welcome to Dayr al-'Asal al-Fuqa
Deir al 'Asal al Fauqa village (fact sheet),   Applied Research Institute–Jerusalem (ARIJ)
Deir al 'Asal al Fauqa village profile, ARIJ
 Deir al 'Asal al Fauqa Village aerial photo,  ARIJ
Survey of Western Palestine, Map 21:    IAA, Wikimedia commons

Villages in the West Bank
Hebron Governorate
Municipalities of the State of Palestine